Công Quốc Hà (born 29 October 1955) is an acclaimed Vietnamese artist and lacquer painter. He was born in Hanoi in 1955 and graduated from the Hanoi Industrial Fine Arts College.

Cong Quoc Ha is one of the most active and best known Vietnamese lacquer painters. He "is well known for his elegant female figures. He belongs to a group of artists who revived the art of traditional Vietnamese lacquer painting and gave it a modern face around the world. He is one of five children of Cong Ton Toan and Dinh Thi Lieu, a well-accomplished family in Hanoi. Among his siblings is his younger sister Cong Kim Hoa, who is an acclaimed artist herself.

Education and work

Since graduating from the Hanoi Industrial Fine Arts University, his works are shown in hundreds of exhibitions worldwide, including international fairs such as the Documenta in Germany, the Euro D'Art in Geneva as well as in international exhibitions from Buenos Aires to New York, Paris, Singapore, Tokyo and Melbourne. He also received numerous awards for his works worldwide. He was also responsible for the first nude exhibition in Vietnam, in 1992, where he had 20 paintings at the show.

Between 1995 and 2000 he served as Deputy Secretary General of Hanoi Fine Arts Association, and he was Chairman of the Young Painter Club, Vietnam Fine Art Association between 1995-1999. He heads the Hanoi branch of the Vietnam Fine Arts Association between 2010 and 2014.

In 2005,Cong Quoc Ha founded the HANOI ART HOUSE in Kisa, Sweden together with his daughter Cong Nu Hoang Anh. The Art House shows collections and exhibitions of art and cultural works, especially about the Vietnamese culture. Since 2012, Cong Quoc Ha works and lives together with his wife and son in Sweden. Cong Quoc Ha is the Art Director of the HANOI ART HOUSE.

Private life

In 1980, Cong Quoc Ha married the artist Pham Le Hang (born 1960), the couple has three children:

 Cong Nu Hoang Anh (daughter, born 1981, Hanoi-Vietnam), lives and works in Sweden
 Cong Quoc Long (son, born 1988, Hanoi-Vietnam), lives in Sweden
 Cong Nu Thuy Trang (daughter, born 1990, Hanoi-Vietnam), lives and works in Switzerland

Awards
 1978: Metropolitan Fine Arts Exhibition, Hanoi Fine Arts Association.
 1983: Graphic Arts Book Printing, Ministry of Culture.
 1985: Illustration Graphic Arts Exhibition, “Van Nghe Magazine” and Vietnam Fine Art Association.
 1995: Metropolitan Fine Arts Exhibition, Hanoi Fine Arts Association.
 1996: Young Artists Exhibition I, Sweden Fund for Cultural Peroration Exhibition of Prizewinning Painting, Hanoi Area, Vietnam Association of Fine Arts Quinquennial Literature & Arts Association.
 2000: Medal for Vietnam Fine Arts Cultural Career
 2003: Medal for Vietnam Fine Arts Career

References

External links
 Hanoi Art Gallery
 Website for Cong Quoc Ha

1955 births
Living people
20th-century Vietnamese painters
21st-century Vietnamese painters